Rudboneh District is a district (bakhsh) in Lahijan County, Gilan Province, Iran. At the 2006 census, its population was 31,203, in 9,309 families.  The District has one city: Rudboneh. The District has two rural districts (dehestan): Rudboneh Rural District and Shirju Posht Rural District.

References 

Lahijan County
Districts of Gilan Province